Julian Benson (born 26 February 1971) is a talent agent, choreographer and is also known for his role as a judge on the RTÉ One series, Dancing with the Stars.

Early life
Julian Benson was born in Adelaide, Australia where he did his formative dance training. He and his family moved to Ireland when Julian was twelve years old.

Professional dance career
Benson studied in University College Dublin obtaining a degree in English and Psychology, before studying for two years in Paris. He would eventually become the Head of Dance in Trinity College Dublin.

As a choreographer, Benson has produced many productions including The Nutcracker with the Scottish Ballet.

Talent agency
Benson runs Julian Benson Management. A talent agency for television presenters and actors. Some of his clients include Boyzone member Mikey Graham, Fair City actors Maclean Burke and Donna Anita Nikolaisen, and television presenter, Eoghan McDermott whom Benson regards as one of his best friends.

Media career
From 2017 to 2020, Benson was a judge on  the Irish version of Dancing with the Stars for RTÉ One alongside Loraine Barry and Brian Redmond. Because of his health condition, Benson missed several week's judging each year. He was replaced by Darren Bennett.

Personal life
Benson was diagnosed with cystic fibrosis at the age of two and was given a life expectancy of thirteen years. Benson kept his diagnosis private for over forty years before revealing it in an interview with Ryan Tubridy on The Late Late Show.

In 2018, Benson launched the Julian Benson CF Foundation, an organisation fighting to help those with cystic fibrosis. On 8 December 2018, the foundation had a charity ball in order to raise funds. It was hosted by Eoghan McDermott and attended by a number of Irish celebrities.

Benson is a fluent Irish language speaker.

Benson is openly gay.

References

Dancing with the Stars (Irish TV series)
Living people
1971 births
LGBT choreographers
Australian LGBT broadcasters
Australian choreographers
Australian emigrants to Ireland
Australian television personalities